is a mountain located in the Daisetsuzan Volcanic Group of the Ishikari Mountains, Hokkaidō, Japan. It sits on the southern rim of the Ohachi Taira caldera.

See also
List of volcanoes in Japan
List of mountains in Japan

References
 Geographical Survey Institute

Matsuda